Paschim Guwahati Mahavidyalaya, established in 1978, also known as PGM, is an undergraduate, coeducational college situated at Dharapur Chariali in Guwahati, Assam. This college is affiliated with the Gauhati University.

Departments

Assamese
English
History
Education
Economics
Philosophy
Political Science
Hindi
Geography
Commerce
Management
Finance
Statistics

References

External links
https://pgmdharapur.ac.in/

Universities and colleges in Guwahati
Colleges affiliated to Gauhati University
Educational institutions established in 1978
1978 establishments in Assam